Intensity is a 1988 action game designed by Andrew Braybrook, developed by Graftgold, and published by Firebird Software. It was released for the Commodore 64 and ZX Spectrum platforms.

Intensity received generally positive reviews from video game critics and had underwhelming sales.

Gameplay
Intensity is an action game. The gameplay involves shooting aliens who are attacking a space station and rescuing colonists.

Development
Intensity was designed by Andrew Braybrook, known for designing Morpheus, Paradroid, and Uridium. It was published by Firebird Software. It took Braybrook nine months to write and design the game. It was released for the Commodore 64 and ZX Spectrum in 1988.

Reception

Intensity received generally positive reviews from video game critics. Sales were lacklustre, disappointing developer Graftgold.

References

External links
 
 
 

1988 video games
Action video games
Commodore 64 games
Graftgold games
Single-player video games
Telecomsoft games
Video games developed in the United Kingdom
Video games set in outer space
ZX Spectrum games